Jennifer Lee Grant (born  1973) is a retired United States Air Force brigadier general who last served as the first director of plans and programs of the United States Space Force from 2020 to 2023.

An Air Force Inspector General report on Grant's time leading the 50th Space Wing from June 2017 to June 2019 was released in October 2019. Among other criticisms, the report "determined the conditions Col. Grant created were the worst the IG team had seen in 20 years.” Inspectors identified three significant incidents for further examination, including one airman, whom Grant bullied, who died by suicide in 2019. Grant was nominated to become a brigadier general on Nov. 26, 2018. The Senate approved her nomination in December 2018, about 10 months before the report on her leadership deficiencies was released. She put on the rank of brigadier general in July 2020.

Grant retired from active duty on March 1, 2023.

References

External links
 

Living people
Year of birth missing (living people)
Place of birth missing (living people)
United States Air Force generals
Brigadier generals